The Depopulation Bomb is the debut studio album of Black Lung, released in 1994 by Iridium Records. The album was re-released on August 15, 1995 by Fifth Colvmn Records with an additional coda titled "Horselover Fat".

Reception
Sonic Boom said "this time Black Lung moves away from sound experimentation of dreams towards more of techno ambient style of instrumentation" and "don't construe that to mean that it is just another rave album, but simply that the programming has become more beat oriented with a great deal of focus on rhythms and melodies rather than soundscapes of the past.

Track listing

Personnel 
Adapted from the liner notes of The Depopulation Bomb.

Black Lung
 David Thrussell – keyboards

Production and design
 Richard Grant (I+T=R) – mastering
 Dr. Donald M. MacArthur – liner notes
 François Tétaz – design

Release history

References

External links 
 

1994 albums
Black Lung (musical project) albums
Fifth Colvmn Records albums
Nova Zembla (record label) albums